Charles-Henri Jean-Marie Baker (born June 3, 1955) is a Haitian industrialist and presidential candidate. He is a former member of the Group of 184. Baker was a candidate for president in Haiti's 2006 and 2010 elections.

Early and personal life

Baker was born in Port-au-Prince. His father Édouard Baker was a mulatto who was a prominent engineer, agronomist, well-known soccer player, and son of an Episcopalian missionary from England, who married an Afro-Haitian woman. His mother, Louise Barranco, was a businesswoman from a light-skinned mulatto elite family, who was the founder of the first supermarket chain in Haiti and whose father was a trader. Baker has two brothers and three sisters.

After completing his elementary education in Haiti, he traveled to the United States. In 1972 he graduated from Redondo Union High School in Redondo Beach, California. He later attended Saint Leo University in Florida, graduating with a Bachelor of Arts degree in business administration in 1976. In 1975, he married Marie Florence Apaid, sister of André Apaid. He has four children and eleven grandchildren.

Business career

Baker began his business career as a manager at the age 21 in his family-owned and operated supermarket chain. When his father became ill, he took over the family-owned 90-acre farm Habitation Dujour, which grew sugarcane, banana, and tobacco. Eventually, the land expanded another 120 acres which made it the largest flue-cured tobacco farm in Haiti, with more than 200 acres. Simultaneously, from 1982 to 1985 he worked with the tobacco growers of Haiti through the Comme il faut Company, where he held the position of Assistant to the Leaf Growing Manager.

Beginning in the late 1980s, Baker purchased a garment factory, Pantalon Boucanier S.A.. This factory, which is monitored by Betterworks an affiliate of OIT, adheres to strict international standards. It employs hundreds of Haitians who are paid the minimum salary required by Haitian law. It has set up an incentive program which permits workers to make 50% more than the minimum salary while getting the 25% benefits required by Haitian law. Baker sells the garments produced in these factories to major corporations such as Walmart and K-Mart.

In 2000, he joined the Association des Industries d’Haïti as a member and a year later became its vice president.

Baker was a prominent member of the Group of 184 (G 184), a coalition of Haitian organizations opposing Haitian President Jean-Bertrand Aristide. The group's actions contributed to the US orchestrated coup d'état against Aristide in 2004.

2006 Haitian presidential election

In August 2005, Baker announced his intention to run for the president of Haiti in the elections originally planned for November 2005 but later moved to February 2006.

Baker and his Respè coalition received 8.24 percent of the vote, losing to René Préval.

2010 Haitian presidential election

Charles Henri Baker ran for President of Haiti in the November 28, 2010 Haiti elections, under the Respè Party of Haiti.

Quotes
 "I have one country, and four children. I don’t plan on living any place else. I love my country, I love the Haitian people. I’m proud to be a candidate for public office in Haiti."
 "I’m not going anywhere. Haiti is my home. I've been fighting for democracy for thirty years, and I’ll continue to fight for what I believe in."
 "All Haitians have been placed on an equal level field. The rich and poor, uneducated and educated, the street merchant and the elite business community have all suffered tremendously. Not only did the earth move but the thoughts of many of us who live in Haiti have been shaken from the past ways of doing things, to the desire to get Haiti right in its rebuilding."

References and footnotes
Notes

Citations

External links

1955 births
Living people
Respect (Haiti) politicians
Haitian activists
Haitian educators
Haitian businesspeople
People from Port-au-Prince
Saint Leo University alumni
Candidates for President of Haiti
Haitian people of English descent
Haitian people of Spanish descent
Haitian people of Mulatto descent